Tiryaki Hasan Pasha (Turkish: Tiryaki Hasan Paşa); also called Alacaatlı Hasan Pasha (1530–1611), was an Ottoman military commander, who participated in the Long Turkish War. He received his education in the Enderun school.

Biography 
He was one of the attendants of Prince Murad when Murad was the governor of Manisa. After Murad became sultan (Murad III), Hasan was promoted to provincial governor. After a short time, he was sent to Szigetvár as a governor and served as the Beylerbey of Bosnia in 1594. He participated in the Vaç Expedition in October 1595. In a battle in Wallachia, when those around him retreated, Tiryaki Hasan Pasha were said rode his horse alone and prevented the battlefield completely overrun by the enemies. Tiryaki also became a somewhat "father figure" towards Transivalnian prince Gabriel Bethlen.

In 1600 during Long Turkish War, the Ottoman army occupied Kanije (modern Nagykanizsa in southwest Hungary). Naģykanizsa fell to Tiryaki Hasan Pasha in 1600, and Tiryaki Hasan Pasha then garrisoned the city with 7,000 men. However, in the next year, Ferdinand II tried to regain the fort, with an army of 50,000, the siege of Nagykanizsa began on 9 September 1601. During the siege and frequent clashes, the Austrians lost 18,000 men. According to the Ottoman record of Nagykanzisa Gazavatname (Nagykanzisa campaign narrative), Tiryaki Hasan Pasha command his deputy, Kara ömer Agha to let some enemy prisoners escape and melded into enemy forces of "a hundred and fifty bandur, and a five hundred Hungarian cavalry troopers" which present in Nagykanizsa. He instructed Kara ömer to ensure the prisoners hear the soldiers speak in Hungarian. The "escaped prisoners" then spread information that the Ottomans has conducted a secret alliance with the Hungarian and Croatian elements within Habsburg army. This narrative record about Tiryaki Hasan Pasha conduct were considered a Counterintelligence tactic employed by him to sow discord among the enemy ranks. In October, Ferdinand had to end the skirmish temporarily because of the coming winter and resorted to construct winter encampments around the fort to continue the siege. until on 18 November 1601, Hasan Pasha organized a surprise charge that totally rout the army of Ferdinand. The skillful hidden movements of one hundred cannons during the defense and the concealing of his main cavalry until the last time were became the success of Tiryaki in defense of Kanije against massive army. the Austrian army was driven back and 47 Austrian cannon were acquired. For the next 89 years Kanije was an Ottoman fort.

After the victory of Kanije, Hasan Pasha was promoted to Beylerbey (high governor) of Bosnia, and later of Budin and Rumelia. Tiryaki Hasan Pasa were also planned the military strategy during the Ottoman victorious battle at Oruç Ovası.

At the end of the Long Turkish war, Tiryaki Hasan Pasha opposed the conclusive decision to end of the war which resulted in the Ottoman's some territorial losses. Tiryaki Hasan Pasha participated in Kuyucu Murad Pasha's campaign against the Jelali revolts in Anatolia. In 1608 he returned to Budin, where he died in 1611. Ottoman historian Mehmed Süreyya recorded Tiryaki never suffered single defeat in any battles he participated during his life.

Modern culture 
Hikaye-i Tiryaki Gazi Hasan Paşa (The History of Tiryaki Hasan Pasha) that was inscribed by Salih Ağa Divitdar on 21 March 1789 which has become a heroic model in Turkish culture, which portrays him based from corpus of Gazavat-i Tiryaki Hasan Paşa (the military expedition of Tiryaki Hasan) where he was depicted as religious, just, and competent national figure. The portrayal from Hikaye has spawned legend such as Tiryaki supernatural ability to predict the Habsburg army movement in Szigetvár by observing the unusual behavior from two flocks of birds.

His religious image derived from the record that Tiryaki always lead his men to pray before doing particularly difficult battles. the legendary stories about the corpses of fallen Ottoman soldiers in the siege of Nagykanizsa which still intact when unearthed from their burial also further strengthen the pious legend of Tiryaki Hasan, who served as commander of the battle.

References

External links 
 Kılıç, Abdullah, "Hasan Paşa (Tiryaki)", (1999), Yaşamları ve Yapıtlarıyla Osmanlılar Ansiklopedisi, İstanbul:Yapı Kredi Kültür Sanat Yayıncılık A.Ş. C.1 s.546 ISBN 975-08-0072-9

16th-century people from the Ottoman Empire
1530 births
1611 deaths
Military personnel of the Ottoman Empire
Pashas
People of the Long Turkish War
Year of birth uncertain
Year of birth unknown
17th-century Ottoman military personnel